Félix Bécquer (born 1 February 1947) is a Mexican sprinter. He competed in the men's 100 metres at the 1968 Summer Olympics.

References

External links
 

1947 births
Living people
Athletes (track and field) at the 1968 Summer Olympics
Mexican male sprinters
Olympic athletes of Mexico
Athletes from Mexico City
20th-century Mexican people